Pardos (feminine pardas) is a term used in the former Portuguese and Spanish colonies in the Americas to refer to the triracial descendants of Southern Europeans, Indigenous Americans and West Africans. In some places they were defined as neither exclusively mestizo (Indigenous American-South European descent), nor mulatto (West African-Southern European descent), nor zambo (Indigenous American-West African descent). In colonial Mexico, pardo "became virtually synonymous with mulatto, thereby losing much of its Indigenous referencing". In the eighteenth century, pardo might have been the preferred label for blackness. Unlike negro, pardo had no association with slavery. Casta paintings from eighteenth-century Mexico use the label negro, never pardo, to identify Africans paired with Spaniards.

In Brazil, the word pardo has had a general meaning since the beginning of the colonisation. In the famous letter by Pêro Vaz de Caminha, for example, in which Brazil was first described by the Portuguese, the Indigenous Americans were called "pardo": "Pardo, naked, without clothing". The word has ever since been used to cover: African/South European mixes, South Asian/South European mixes, Indigenous American/South European/South Asian/African mixes and Indigenous Americans themselves.

For example, Diogo de Vasconcelos, a widely known historian from Minas Gerais, mentions the story of Andresa de Castilhos. According to 18th-century accounts, Andresa de Castilhos was described by the following: "I declare that Andresa de Castilhos, parda woman ... has been freed ... is a descendant of the native gentiles of the land ... I declare that Andresa de Castilhos is the daughter of a white man and a (Christian) neophyte (Indigenous) woman".

The historian Maria Leônia Chaves de Resende says that the word pardo was used to classify people with partial or full Indigenous American ancestry. A Manoel, natural son of Ana carijó, was baptised as a 'pardo'; in Campanha several Indigenous Americans were classified as 'pardo'; the Indigenous American João Ferreira, Joana Rodriges and Andreza Pedrosa, for example, were described as 'freed pardo'; a Damaso identifies as a 'freed pardo' of the ''native of the land''; etc. According to Chaves de Resende, the growth of the pardo population in Brazil includes the descendants of Indigenous American and not only those of African descent: "the growth of the 'pardo' segment had not only to do with the descendants of Africans, but also with the descendants of the Indigenous American, in particular the carijós and bastards, included in the condition of 'pardo'".

The American historian Muriel Nazzari in 2001 noted that the "pardo" category has absorbed those persons of Indigenous American descent in the records of São Paulo: "This paper seeks to demonstrate that, though many Indians and mestizos did migrate, those who remained in São Paulo came to be classified as pardos."

Pardos in the Caribbean and Northern South America 
Most pardos within Caribbean and Northern South America historically inhabited the territories where the Spanish conquistadores imported slaves during colonial times, such as the Captaincies of: Cuba, Santo Domingo, Puerto Rico, Colombia, Venezuela and Ecuador as well as the Caribbean and Pacific coasts of the Viceroyalty of New Granada. 

For example, the 1887 census conducted by Spain of Puerto Rico showed Aguadilla municipality had a population of 16,140 with 1,390 pardo men and 1,650 parda women, with the rest classified as black or white.

In Peru, Pardos (or Afro-Mestizo), are referred to the mixture of Spanish and Indigenous American with a little afro contribution, located exclusively along the whole coast, in greater proportion between the regions of Tumbes to Ica.

Pardos in Brazil 

In Brazil,  is a race/skin colour category used by the Brazilian Institute of Geography and Statistics (IBGE) in Brazilian censuses, with historic roots in the colonial period. The term "" is more commonly used to refer to mixed-race Brazilians, individuals with varied racial ancestries.

The term is still popular in Brazil. The term  was first used in a Brazilian census in 1872. The censuses of 1900 and 1920 did not ask about race, arguing that "the answers largely hid the truth".

See also
Afro-Latin Americans
Casta
Melungeon
Mulatto
Race and ethnicity in Latin America
Romani people

References

Spanish words and phrases
Multiracial affairs in the Americas
Ethnic groups in Latin America
Person of color